The 2011 WK League was the third season of the WK League, South Korea's top level women's football league. The regular season began on 21 March 2011 and ended on 19 September 2011. Suwon FMC were the defending champions.

Two new clubs joined the league this season. Eight clubs competed in a triple round-robin, for a total of 21 matches.

The season was won by Goyang Daekyo.

Changes from 2010 
 Unlike the previous season, the second and third placed teams after the regular season played a two-legged play-off. The winner played against the regular season winner in the Grand final.

Teams

Table

Results

Matches 1 to 14

Matches 15 to 21

All-Stars Match
 Team Gaia : Busan Sangmu, Chungbuk Sportstoto, Chungnam Ilhwa Chunma, Goyang Daekyo Noonnoppi Kangaroos
 Team Athena : Incheon Hyundai Steel Red Angels, Jeonbuk KSPO, Seoul City Amazones, Suwon Facilities Management Corporation

Playoff and championship
The playoff was played as a single leg, and the championship final played over two legs.

Playoff

Championship final
1st leg

2nd leg

Goyang Daekyo Kangaroos won 5–3 on aggregate.

References

women.soccerway.com – 2011 WK-League season

2009
Women
South Korea
South Korea